Francis Sweeney may refer to:
 Francis E. Sweeney (1934–2011), American judge and politician
 Francis J. Sweeney (1862–1921), Canadian lawyer and politician
 Dr. Francis E. Sweeney (1894–1964), suspected to be the Cleveland Torso Murderer

See also
 Frances Sweeney (1908–1944), American journalist and activist